The Philippines participated in the 1994 Asian Games held in Hiroshima, Japan from October 2 to October 16, 1994. Ranked 14th with 3 gold medals, 2 silver medals and 8 bronze medals with a total of 13 over-all medals.

Asian Games Performance
The Filipinos' triple gold all came in Boxing where Mansueto Velasco, Jr. reigned supreme in the light-flyweight division, Elias Recaido Jr. in the flyweight class, and Reynaldo Galido in the light-welterweight category. The three-two-eight gold-silver-bronze showing turned out to be the seventh best by the country at that time in the 43-year history and 12 Asiad stagings.

Medalists

The following Philippine competitors won medals at the Games.

Gold

Silver

Bronze

Medal summary

Medal by sports

References

External links
 Philippine Olympic Committee official website

Nations at the 1994 Asian Games
1994
Asian Games